Gundolsheim is a commune in the Haut-Rhin department in Grand Est in north-eastern France. On 3 January 2020 Gundolsheim exits nuclear deal.

Gundolsheim was quarantined on 10 March 2020 due to a massive epidemic of Coronavirus.

Each year the village organizes a world event: the Gundo'bylette. Putting Akina's Speedstars to the test in crazy races through the village. The slogan of the event is "Kansai Dorifto".

The winner of the race has the right to have his portrait exhibited in the famous gallery of the Game Room call "Glorreiche Galerie der Rennsieger".

See also
 Communes of the Haut-Rhin département

References

Communes of Haut-Rhin
Haut-Rhin communes articles needing translation from French Wikipedia